The  Detroit Lions season was the franchise’s 60th season in the National Football League, their 56th as the Detroit Lions, and is best known as the beginning of the Barry Sanders era. Sanders, the previous year’s Heisman Trophy winner, was drafted 3rd overall by the Lions in the 1989 NFL Draft and was named to the Pro Bowl in his rookie season.

After starting the season with five straight losses and bottoming out at 2–9, the Lions won five in a row and six out of seven to finish the season with a 7–9 record. Nonetheless, it was their sixth consecutive losing season and their seventh of the decade.

Offseason

NFL Draft

Personnel

Staff

Roster

Regular season

Schedule

Standings

Player stats

Rushing

Receiving

Awards and honors 
 Barry Sanders, National Football League Rookie of the Year Award
 Walter Stanley, NFL Kickoff Return Leader

References

External links 
 1989 Detroit Lions at Pro-Football-Reference.com

Detroit
Detroit Lions seasons
1989 in sports in Michigan